Colonel Thomas ('Tom') Edward Vickers V.D. (9 July 1833 – 19 October 1915) was Chairman of Vickers Limited.

Career
The second son of Edward Vickers and Anne Naylor, Tom Vickers was born on 9 July 1833. He was educated at Sheffield Collegiate School and at Neuwied in Germany. He worked in the family business of Naylor Vickers & Co.

Tom Vickers, together with his brother Albert, took over the business in the 1850s. Tom developed the firm into a leading steel casting business using the German Riepe process and in 1867 it was incorporated as Vickers, Sons & Co Limited with himself as Chairman.

Tom Vickers lived at Bolsover Hill and became Commanding Officer of the Hallamshire Rifles in 1871 and Master Cutler in 1872. He continued to serve in the battalion as a volunteer and honorary colonel, being awarded the Volunteer Officers' Decoration when it was instated in 1892. He handed over the chairmanship of the company to Albert Vickers in 1909 and died in London in 1915.

Family
In 1860 he married Frances Mary Douglas; they had two sons (Douglas Vickers and Ronald Vickers) and four daughters.

Gallery

References

Master Cutlers
British civil engineers
1833 births
1915 deaths
York and Lancaster Regiment officers
People educated at Sheffield Collegiate School
19th-century English businesspeople